The 1955 NCAA Track and Field Championships were contested June 17−18 at the 34th annual NCAA-sanctioned track meet to determine the individual and team national champions of men's collegiate track and field in the United States. This year's events were hosted by the University of Southern California at the Los Angeles Memorial Coliseum in Los Angeles.

Hosts USC won their seventh consecutive team national championship, the Trojans' 19th title in program history.

Team Result
Note: Top 10 finishers only
(H) = Hosts

See also
 NCAA Men's Outdoor Track and Field Championship
 1954 NCAA Men's Cross Country Championships

References

NCAA Men's Outdoor Track and Field Championship
NCAA Track and Field Championships
NCAA
NCAA Track and Field Championships